Anbessa City Bus Service Enterprise or Anbessa is a state-owned public transport operator headquartered in Addis Ababa, Ethiopia.

Overview
The Anbessa City Bus started as a share company founded in 1945 and owned by Emperor Haile Selassie and members of the royal family, before it was nationalised in 1974. It came to be a public enterprise only after it was re-established in 1994.

Anbessa has recently begun to acquire buses assembled locally by the Metal & Engineering Corporation, a newly established military industrial complex of the Ethiopian government. It has included in its fleet more than 500 of these locally assembled buses known as Bishoftu Buses, which bear the town's name where the assembly plant is located. Eight of these buses are in Jimma, although Anbessa only operates in Addis Ababa and special zones of Oromia Regional State.
Currently, there are around 1000 city buses under the enterprise. Nearly 40 percent of these are out of service due to technical issues. The older DAF-Berkhof buses that were built in The Netherlands are being refurbished to extend their usability. The enterprise also operates 93 routes in and around the capital Addis Ababa. Each bus has a capacity for 100 passengers (30 seated and 70 standing).

These buses cover a collective distance of 54,000 km daily and provide their services to 1.5 million people, as indicated in the 2006/07 to 2010/11 five year strategic document of the City Administration.

See also
Marathon Motors Engineering

References

Transport in Addis Ababa
Companies based in Addis Ababa
Bus companies of Ethiopia